The plump banded gecko (Cyrtodactylus dattanensis), also known commonly as Khan's bow-fingered gecko, is a species of gecko, a lizard in the family Gekkonidae. The species is endemic to Pakistan.

Geographic range
C. dattanensis is found in northwestern Pakistan.

Reproduction
C. dattanensis is oviparous.

References

Further reading
Bauer, Aaron M.; Masroor, Rafaqat; Titus-McQuillan, James; Heinicke, Matthew P.; Daza, Juan D.; Jackman, Todd R. (2013). "A preliminary phylogeny of the Palearctic naked-toed geckos (Reptilia: Squamata: Gekkonidae) with taxonomic implications". Zootaxa 3599 (4): 301-324.
Khan MS (1980). "A new species of gecko from northern Pakistan". Pakistan Journal of Zoology 12 (1): 11-16. (Gymnodactylus dattanensis, new species).

Cyrtodactylus
Reptiles described in 1980